"Black Night" is a song by British hard rock band Deep Purple, first released as a single in June 1970 and later included on the 25th Anniversary version of their 1970 album, Deep Purple in Rock. It became a hit following its release, peaking at No. 2 on UK charts, and remains Deep Purple's highest charting UK single. It topped the charts in Switzerland, and is one of only two singles from the band to chart in Ireland, peaking at No. 4, thus making it the group's only Irish Top 10 hit. It was also the second non-album single penned by the band and also reached number 6 in South Africa.

Writing process and recording
Once Deep Purple in Rock had been completed, EMI asked for a suitable single to be recorded to help promote the album. Though Roger Glover states that Ricky Nelson's 1962 hard rocking arrangement of the George Gershwin song "Summertime" was the basis for the Mk II Deep Purple single "Black Night", it is also similar to Blues Magoos's 1966 psychedelic hit song "(We Ain't Got) Nothin' Yet". In the BBC documentary Heavy Metal Britannia, keyboardist Jon Lord supports Glover's statement about the song's origin, stating "Black Night was nicked from the bass line in Ricky Nelson's Summertime" and then proceeds to play the bassline riff on his grand piano.

Live performances
"Black Night" made its way into the setlist soon after release, generally as the first encore.  It was not played in full after Ian Gillan and Roger Glover left the band in 1973, but snippets were often played by Ritchie Blackmore as part of his improvisations.  On the reformation of Deep Purple in 1984, it returned as part of the main set list. There are many versions available on Deep Purple live albums.

Personnel
Ian Gillan – vocals
Ritchie Blackmore – guitar
Roger Glover – bass
Ian Paice – drums
Jon Lord – organ

References

Sources
 

1970 singles
Deep Purple songs
Number-one singles in Switzerland
Songs written by Ritchie Blackmore
British heavy metal songs
Songs written by Ian Gillan
Songs written by Roger Glover
Songs written by Jon Lord
Songs written by Ian Paice
Songs involved in plagiarism controversies
Songs about nights